WRN Broadcast, formerly known as World Radio Network, is an international broadcast services company based in the United Kingdom that works with television channels and radio broadcasters, media owners and brands enabling them to deliver content to target audiences worldwide. WRN Broadcast has developed since 1992 when it was founded as an international radio distribution company known as World Radio Network, which redistributed news and information programs produced by various international public radio networks.

Following its acquisition of TSI Broadcast in April 2009, the company expanded its offering to become a comprehensive global broadcast services provider working across traditional and digital platforms to supply television and radio clients with worldwide coverage and managed services.

Clients include Top Up TV and Wananchi Group Holdings. WRN Broadcast also works with MUTV, Jazz FM and Voice of America.

WRN Broadcast Limited was acquired by Babcock International Group plc in March 2015.

Encompass completes acquisition of Babcock's media services in September 2018.

List of relayed stations in English
The World Radio Network channels in English, Russian, Arabic, and Persian can be received from direct-to-home satellite, cable TV, internet audio streams, local affiliates as well as via the TuneIn app available on IOS and Android.

English channel operates different programming schedules for Europe, North America and listeners in Africa and Asia.
 Banns Radio International
 Democracy Now!
 Deutsche Welle
 Israel Radio International
 KBS World Radio
 PCJ Radio International
 Polish Radio
 Radio Guangdong
 NHK World Radio Japan
 Radio Prague
 Radio Slovakia International
 RTÉ Ireland
 Vatican Radio
 World of Radio

References

External links
World Radio Network

International broadcasters
International radio networks
Sirius Satellite Radio channels
XM Satellite Radio channels
Radio organizations
1992 establishments in the United Kingdom
Mass media companies established in 1992
2009 mergers and acquisitions
2015 mergers and acquisitions
2018 mergers and acquisitions